This Will Be (subtitled The Jazzpar Prize) is the first live album by jazz saxophonist Chris Potter, recorded at concerts in Denmark celebrating his receipt of the 2000 Jazzpar Prize and released on the Danish Storyville label in 2001.

Reception

The AllMusic review by Ken Dryden awarded the album 4 stars stating "With all of the attention that multi-instrumentalist Chris Potter began getting at the dawn of the 21st century in his homeland of the U.S., he had already been awarded the Jazzpar Prize in 2000, with part of the honor including this special concert recording made to feature his work ... this young man (not yet 30 at the time) displays tremendous chops on tenor sax and the skills of a seasoned composer and arranger ... well worth acquiring by post-bop fans."

Track listing
All compositions by Chris Potter
 "This Will Be" − 11:54
 "Okinawa" − 11:24
 "Jazzpair Suite: Part One - Chorale" − 1:55
 "Jazzpair Suite: Part Two - Medium" − 10:57
 "Jazzpair Suite: Part Three - Rubato" − 6:29
 "Jazzpair Suite: Part Four - Tribute to Hodges & Ellington" − 7:12
 "Jazzpair Suite: Part Five - Ballad" − 3:37
 "Jazzpair Suite: Part Six - Folk Tune" − 10:25
 "In a Sentimental Mood (Encore)" (Duke Ellington) − 8:28

Personnel
Chris Potter - soprano saxophone, tenor saxophone, flute, bass clarinet
Kasper Tranberg − cornet (tracks 3-8)
Peter Fuglsang − flute, bass clarinet (tracks 3-8)
Kevin Hays - piano
Jacob Fischer − guitar (tracks 3-8)
Scott Colley − bass
Billy Drummond - drums

References

Chris Potter (jazz saxophonist) live albums
2001 live albums
Storyville Records live albums